The following highways are numbered 465:

Canada
Manitoba Provincial Road 465
New Brunswick Route 465

Japan
 Japan National Route 465

United States
  Interstate 465
  Missouri Route 465
  Pennsylvania Route 465
  Puerto Rico Highway 465
  Farm to Market Road 465